Karangan or Karanagan or Kerengan may refer to:
 Karangan, East Azerbaijan
 Karangan, Razavi Khorasan
 Karangan, administrative division of Kulim district in the state of Kedah, Malaysia
 Karangan River, which forms the Sangkulirang bay on the east coast of Borneo